Ida M. Eliot (1839–1923) was an American writer, educator, philosopher, and entomologist who published one of the first books on caterpillars, Caterpillars and Their Moths (1902) with Caroline Soule.

Early life and career
Eliot was born in 1839 in New Bedford, Massachusetts to Congressman Thomas D. Eliot. Eliot graduated from the Salem Normal School (now Salem State University) in Salem, Massachusetts. Eliot then moved to St. Louis, Missouri where her uncle, William Greenleaf Eliot was a prominent minister and philanthropist. In St. Louis after the Civil War, Eliot founded a school for freed African America students in a church basement. She served as assistant principal of the St. Louis Normal School (Harris-Stowe State College) under her close friend, Anna Brackett. Eliot and Brackett associated with the St. Louis Hegelians, and both later published philosophical works. In 1872 when Anna Brackett resigned as principal, Eliot moved with Brackett to New York City. With Brackett, Eliot adopted a three-year-old daughter, Hope Davison, in 1873 and a second daughter, Bertha Lincoln, in 1875. In New York, Brackett and Eliot started The Brackett School for Girls, located at 9 West 39th Street, and they hired notable female teachers such as Mary Mitchell Birchall, the first woman to receive a bachelor's degree from a New England college. Eliot's adopted daughter, Hope, went on to graduate from college. By 1900 Ida had moved back to New Bedford with her daughter, Ida, and sister Edith. Eliot died 1923 and was buried in New Bedford, Massachusetts.

Notable works
Poetry for Home and School (1876)
Caterpillars and Their Moths (1902)

References

Bibliography

External links 
 
 
Jane Aitken Papers, American Philosophical Society.
The First American Bible

1839 births
1923 deaths
American women philosophers
19th-century American philosophers
Philosophers of education
Entomology
19th-century American women writers
People from Boston